Mexican Formula Three Championship is the name of a former Mexican Formula Three racing competition. In 2003 was changed to Mexican Formula Renault.

Champions

External links
Mexican Formula 3 Championship at Forix.com
Mexican Formula 3 Championship at Formel3guide.com

1990 establishments in Mexico
2002 disestablishments in Mexico
Recurring sporting events established in 1990
Recurring events disestablished in 2002
Defunct auto racing series
Formula Three series
Auto racing series in Mexico
Defunct sports competitions in Mexico